Jury Chaščavacki, also spelled Yury Khashchavatski (born 18 October 1947 in Odessa, Ukraine) is a Belarusian film director and scenarist, known for his films Kavkazkie plenniki, Bahi Siarpa i Molata, Aranzhavyja Kamizelki, Dazhyts da lubovi and Obyknovennyj prezident.

Life 
In 2002, he was arrested following participation in a protest of the Belarusian government.  He spent 10 days in jail.  He claimed he spent the time in jail giving lectures to other inmates about documentary film techniques.

During the 2020 Belarusian protests he became a member of the Coordination Council of Sviatlana Tsikhanouskaya.

Film Director

Ploshcha (Kalinovski Square, 2007)
Oleg Popov - Der Sonnenclown (2003) (TV)
Kavkazkie plenniki (A Prisoner in the Caucasus, 2002) 
Obyknovennyj prezident (An Ordinary President, 1996)
Russkoye stchastye (Russian Luck, 1992)
Zdes byl Krylov (1987)

Writer

Ploshcha (Kalinovski Square, 2007)
Kavkazkie plenniki (A Prisoner in the Caucasus, 2002) 
Obyknovennyj prezident (An Ordinary President, 1996)

Awards
 1998 - Nestor Almendros Award for Obyknovennyj prezident (1996) at Human Rights Watch International Film Festival
 2002 - Honorable Mention for Kavkazkie plenniki (2002) at Dok Leipzig

References

External links 
Y. Khashchavatski on IATR

1947 births
Living people
Film people from Odesa
Belarusian film directors
Belarusian people of Ukrainian descent